Sevenia garega, the montane tree nymph, is a butterfly in the family Nymphalidae. It is found in eastern Nigeria, Cameroon, the Central African Republic, the Democratic Republic of the Congo, Uganda, Ethiopia, Kenya, north-western Tanzania, northern Zambia and Mozambique. The habitat consists of forests and woodland.

Adults are attracted to fermenting fruit.

The larvae feed on Sapium mannicum.

References

Butterflies described in 1911
garega